Modic may refer to:
Modic changes of the bones of the spine
Andrej Modić, Bosnian professional footballer
Marko Modic, Slovenian photographer, painter and visual artist